Broderick Dyke and Peter Lundgren were the defending champions of the doubles event at the Australian Indoor Championships tennis tournament but lost in the quarterfinals to Luke Jensen and Laurie Warder.

Jim Grabb and Richey Reneberg won in the final 6–4, 6–4 against Jensen and Warder.

Seeds
All eight seeded teams received byes to the second round.

Draw

Finals

Top half

Bottom half

External links
1991 Australian Indoor Championships Doubles Draw

Doubles